is a 1933 Japanese silent drama film directed by Hiroshi Shimizu. It is based on the novel of the same name by Toma Kitabayashi. Film historians have called Japanese Girls at the Harbor an "electrifying masterpiece of Japanese silent cinema", and "visually flamboyant and emotionally intense".

Plot
The friendship of Sunako and Dora, both mixed-race teenagers attending a Catholic school in Yokohama, is at stake with the appearance of careless playboy Henry. After a short-lived affair, Henry leaves Sunako for a third girl, Yoko. In an outburst of jealousy, Sunako shoots Yoko with Henry's revolver in a church's prayer room.

A few years later, Sunako, whom according to the intertitles "God hasn't forgiven", lives with unsuccessful painter Miura and works as a prostitute in a bar, while Henry and Dora are married and expecting a child. When Sunako is re-united with Henry and Dora, new tensions arise, while Miura is acquainted with a young woman from the neighbourhood who turns out to be Yoko, who survived the shooting. Sunako decides not to interfere with Dora's marriage and convinces Henry to stay with his wife and become a responsible father. After Yoko dies of illness, Sunako and Miura decide to start anew elsewhere and leave Yokohama by ship.

Cast
 Michiko Oikawa as Sunako Kurokawa
 Yukiko Inoue as Dora Kennel
 Ureo Egawa as Henry
 Ranko Sawa as Yōko Sheridan
 Yumeko Aizome as Masumi
 Tatsuo Saitō as Miura, the painter
 Yasuo Nanjō as Harada

References

Bibliography

External links
 
 

1933 films
1930s Japanese-language films
Japanese silent films
Japanese drama films
Japanese black-and-white films
Films based on Japanese novels
Films directed by Hiroshi Shimizu
Films with screenplays by Hiroshi Shimizu
Films set in Yokohama
Silent drama films